The HAL HTSE-1200 ("Hindustan Turbo Shaft Engine") is a turboshaft engine under development by India's Hindustan Aeronautics Limited (HAL). It is aimed at 3.5 ton single engine class and 5-8 ton twin engine class helicopter configurations. India will need 5,000-6,000 helicopters to operate in 2020s. This will be an indigenous design giving engine alternatives for the HAL-developed LUH, ALH and LCH. The first run of engine was conducted in February 2018 when it achieved 76% of the rpm required.

There have been 250 tests of engine since inaugural run. The engine has been "progressing well" to have its first flight test by end of 2019. Directionally 
Solidified Gas Generator (GG) Turbine blades were also developed for the engine indigenously.

In the Annual Report 2020-21 of Hindustan Aeronautics Limited, it is revealed that HTSE 1200 achieved 100% speed run on core engine. Sea level trials of core engine completed successfully. HAL Engine Division at Koraput in association with Defence Metallurgical Research Laboratory (DMRL) has developed Single Crystal Blade samples. HAL has also completed the manufacturing of parts and modular assemblies for Power mode engine. HAL is set to start limited series production of engine from 2021 end, which will be for 5 units for further testings.

Specifications (HTSE-1200)

See also

References 

2010s turboshaft engines